The Barbari or Bari is a breed of small domestic goat found in a wide area in India and Pakistan. It is distributed in the states of Haryana, Punjab and Uttar Pradesh in India, and in Punjab and Sindh provinces of Pakistan.

History 

The Barbari goat gets its name from Berbera, a coastal city located on the Indian Ocean in Somalia. The Barbari is one of 20 classified breeds in India and is most commonly found in the north-western arid and semi-arid regions. It is distributed in the states of Haryana, Punjab and Uttar Pradesh in India, and in Punjab and Sindh provinces of Pakistan. It is also reported from Mauritius, Nepal and Vietnam. The world population is estimated at about 2.4 million, of which almost all are in Pakistan.

Characteristics 

The Barbari is a small goat of compact form. The head is small and neat, with small upward-pointing ears and small horns. The coat is short and is most commonly white spotted with brownish red; solid colours also occur. There is a polled strain, the Thori Bari.

Use 

The Barbari is a dual-purpose breed, reared both for meat and for milk, and is well adapted for Indian conditions. It is a seasonal breeder and is used for intensive farming.

References 

Goat breeds originating in India
Goat breeds originating in Pakistan
Animal husbandry in Uttar Pradesh
Goat breeds
Livestock in Punjab
Meat goat breeds